This is a list of Members of Parliament (MPs) elected in the 1979 general election, held on 3 May. This Parliament was dissolved in 1983.

Parliament, which consists of the House of Lords and the elected House of Commons, was convened on Tuesday 15 May 1979 at the Palace of Westminster by Queen Elizabeth II.

Of the 77 newcomers, two were women (Sheila Faith and Sheila Wright). In total, the Parliament had 19 female members (8 Conservative, 11 Labour), fewer than any post-war parliament before or since, with the sole exception of 1951. 

It was the election from which Margaret Thatcher, the incumbent Conservative Party leader became Prime Minister, the first female head of government in the United Kingdom and Europe.

Composition
These representative diagrams show the composition of the parties in the 1979 general election.

Note: The Scottish National Party and Plaid Cymru sit together as a party group. This is not the official seating plan of the House of Commons, which has five rows of benches on each side, with the government party to the right of the Speaker and opposition parties to the left, but with room for only around two-thirds of MPs to sit at any one time.



By-elections
See the list of United Kingdom by-elections.

Two seats were vacant when Parliament was dissolved preparatory to the 1983 general election:
Cardiff, North-West – Michael Roberts (Con) died 10 February 1983
Rhondda – Alec Jones (Lab) died 20 March 1983

References 

1979
1979 United Kingdom general election
Lists of UK MPs 1979–1983
 List
UK MPs